Primo Longobardo  was the name of at least two ships of the Italian Navy named in honour of Primo Longobardo and may refer to:

 , a  launched in 1944 as the USS Pickerel. Transferred to Italy and renamed in 1972. 
 , a  launched in 1992. 

Italian Navy ship names